Tarō Kimura may refer to:

, Japanese journalist
, Japanese politician